Sidebottom v Kershaw, Leese & Co Ltd [1920] 1 Ch 154 is a UK company law case, concerning the alteration of a company's constitution, and the rights of a minority shareholder.

Facts
The company's articles of association were changed to allow for the compulsory purchase of shares of any shareholder who was competing with the company. One shareholder was competing with the company and challenged the alteration. He argued that a previous case, Brown v British Abrasive Wheel Co where a change for compulsory share purchase was held invalid as not being bona fide for the benefit of the company as a whole, should be applied here too.

Judgment
The Court of Appeal held that the article alteration was clearly valid, and very much for the benefit of the company. The court made clear that in Brown v British Abrasive Wheel Co Ashbury J had been wrong to regard good faith alterations and the company’s benefit as two separate ideas. The important question was whether the alteration for the benefit of the company as a whole.

See also
UK company law
Allen v Gold Reefs of West Africa Ltd [1900] 1 Ch 656
Brown v British Abrasive Wheel Co [1919] 1 Ch 290
Dafen Tinplate Co Ltd v Llanelly Steel Co (1907) Ltd [1920] 2 Ch 124
Shuttleworth v Cox Bros and Co (Maidenhead) [1927] 1 Ch 154
Southern Foundries (1926) Ltd v Shirlaw [1940] AC 701
Greenhalgh v Arderne Cinemas Ltd [1951] Ch 286

Notes

References

United Kingdom company case law
Court of Appeal (England and Wales) cases
1920 in British law
1920 in case law